Pi Gamma Omicron was one of the first documented black collegiate fraternities which was founded in 1905.

History
The group was founded at Ohio State University in Columbus, Ohio. The group had 12 members. The group was not known by the Ohio State's registrars office but was known to the Chicago Defender newspaper which wrote an article about Pi Gamma Omicron.  This article about Pi Gamma Omicron took the interest of Alpha Phi Alpha founder Robert H. Ogle who was inspired to transform Alpha Phi Alpha from a  literary society into a fraternity.

It was reported that Pi Gamma Omicron initially desired to become a national fraternity by establishing chapters in Michigan, Minnesota, Illinois, and Indiana according to the Beta Theta Pi correspondent at Ohio State University, but this expansion did not occur.

One member, Elmer Shackelford, went on to earn his law certificate in 1906, then the equivalent of today's law degree.

Influence
Needs expansion: What was Charles Poindexter's connection to Pi Gamma Omicron, if any, a few years before he founded Alpha Phi Alpha?  How is he connected to Robert H. Ogle?  (Mentioned in Parks reference.) Several paragraphs in the Alpha Phi Alpha article discuss this.

Founders
The Founders of Pi Gamma Omicron were:
Leroy Barnett
William Berry
W. E. Davis
Richard Pettiford
Elmer A. Shackelford
John Shavers
Norman Thorne
H. A. Turner
C. C. Underwood
Walter Williams
William Woodward

See also

List of African-American Greek and fraternal organizations
History of North American fraternities and sororities

References

Defunct fraternities and sororities
African-American fraternities and sororities
Student societies in the United States
Student organizations established in 1905
Ohio State University
1905 establishments in Ohio